Oxynoemacheilus eregliensis is a species of stone loach from the streams and springs with gravel, sand or mud substrate and slowly flowing water in the area of the Lake Tuz basin in central Anatolia in Turkey.

References

eregliensis
Fish described in 1978
Taxa named by Petre Mihai Bănărescu
Taxa named by Teodor T. Nalbant